The Čolak-Antić family (also spelled Tcholak-Antitch) is a Serbian family which had prominent members between the time of Revolutionary Serbia until the end of the Second World War. Notable members of the family all descended from Vojvoda Čolak-Anta Simeonović, a military commander during the first war of independence from Ottoman rule and the eponymous founder of the family.

Genealogy 
Note: This family tree is not intended to be exhaustive, but rather aims to show the principal public figures of Čolak-Anta's family.
 Vojvoda Čolak-Anta Simeonović (1777–1853), military commander during the First Serbian uprising twice married (to Jelena then to Stoja)
 Konstantin – Kosta Čolak-Antić (about 1809–1848)x to Jovanka Mitrović, related to Prince Maksim Rasković
 Ilija Čolak-Antić (1836–1894), commander during the Serbo-Turkish Warx Jelena Matić, daughter of Dimitrije Matić, president of the National Assembly of Serbia.
 Jovanka Čolak-Antićx to Ilija Vukićević, writer and playwright.
 Boško Čolak-Antić (1871–1949), Marshal of the Court and diplomat.
 Vojin Čolak-Antić (1877–1945), Royal Serbian Army and Royal Yugoslav Army generalx to Marija Grujić daughter of prime minister Sava Grujić, descendant of Vule Ilic Kolarac.
 Ilya Čolak-Antić (1905–1974), major in the General Staff of the Royal Yugoslav Army
 Grujica Čolak-Antić (1906–1967), major in the Royal Yugoslav Army
 Petar Čolak-Antić (1907–1964), lieutenant colonel in the Royal Yugoslav Army
 Lazar K. Čolak-Antić (1839–1877), lieutenant colonel during the Serbo-Turkish War
 Milica Čolak-Antićx Vladislav F. Ribnikar, founder of Politika
 Ljubomir Čolak-Antić, director of the Military Arsenal in Kragujevac
 Ana Čolak-Antićx to Antonije Djordjević
 Ljubica Marić (1909–2003), composer
 Pavle Čolak-Antić (mother Stoja)x to Jelena Milovanović sister of painter Milan Milovanović
 Voivoda Milivoje Čolak-Antić (1884–1944), Chetnik commander during the Balkan Warsx to Jovana  Ghazis (1892–1987) relative of prime minister Milan Stojadinović
 Milica Čolak-Antić Krstić (1887–1964), architect
 Antonije Čolak-Antić (1890–1908), composer

References 

Čolak-Antić family
Military families of Serbia